Asaperda tenuicornis is a species of beetle in the family Cerambycidae. It was described by Komiya in 1984.

References

Asaperda
Beetles described in 1984